Sedona Prince (born May 12, 2000) is an American basketball player who currently plays for the Oregon Ducks of the Pac-12 Conference. She previously played for the Texas Longhorns of the Big 12 Conference. At , she is one of the tallest players to ever play for Oregon. Prince generated national attention in 2021 after highlighting the 2021 NCAA Division I women's basketball tournament low attendance in games between the men's and women's NCAA tournaments. She was not allowed to compete during the 2019 - 2020 NCAA season due NCAA transfer rules requiring her to sit out a season..

Early life and high school 
Born in Hemet, California and raised in Liberty Hill, Texas, Prince began playing basketball in the fourth grade. After attending Faith Academy of Marble Falls to get away from being bullied for her height, she transferred back to Liberty Hill High School, where they were three-year varsity player. She committed to playing college basketball at Texas, who put out their offer when she was in the eighth grade.

College career

Texas 
Prince redshirted her true freshman season while recovering from a broken right leg suffered at the FIBA Americas U18 Championships. According to her mother, Tambra, the athletic trainers at Texas were urging her to prepare for the upcoming season, having her do exercises a month after her surgery, leading to her suffering a set-back and nearly dying from an infection and the antibiotics she was taking to combat it. Prince announced that they would transfer to Oregon to continue their collegiate career, with reports stating that differences with the Texas medical staff were the main reason for the transfer.

Oregon 
Prince applied for a hardship waiver to grant their immediate eligibility for the 2019–20 season, but had her waiver and appeal denied, leading to her sitting out the season instead.

National team career 
Prince has represented the United States, starting at the 2015 FIBA Americas U16 Championship where she was a part of the team that won bronze. They also won bronze representing the U17 national team at the 2016 FIBA U17 World Cup.

Prince was a part of the United States women's national under-19 basketball team at the 2018 FIBA Under-18 Women's Americas Championship, where she broke her leg during a game in the preliminary round, causing them to miss their true freshman season. Despite the injury, they still earned a gold medal as the United States won the FIBA Americas championship over Canada.

Prince was named a finalist for the 2021 FIBA Women's AmeriCup roster in April, and was officially named to the roster in June.

Career statistics

College 

|-
| style="text-align:left;" | 2018–19
| style="text-align:left;" | Texas
| style="text-align:center;" colspan=12 |  Redshirted
|-
| style="text-align:left;" | 2019–20
| style="text-align:left;" | Oregon
| style="text-align:center;" colspan=12 | Sat out due to NCAA transfer rules
|-
| style="text-align:left;" | 2020–21
| style="text-align:left;" | Oregon
| 19 || 10 || 19.8 || .545 || .286 || .800 || 3.9 || 1.3 || 0.6 || 1.5 || 0.8 || 10.4
|-
| style="text-align:center;" | Career
| style="text-align:center;" | 3 years, 2 teams
| 19 || 10 || 19.8 || .545 || .286 || .800 || 3.9 || 1.3 || 0.6 || 1.5 || 0.8 || 10.4

Personal life 
Prince is the daughter of James and Tambra Prince. James is a retired Marine while Tambra played basketball and volleyball at St. John's College in Kansas. She also has a younger brother, Diego.

References

External links 
 
 Oregon Ducks profile
 Texas Longhorns profile
 USA Basketball profile

2000 births
Living people
People from Hemet, California
People from Liberty Hill, Texas
Basketball players from California
Basketball players from Texas
LGBT basketball players
Power forwards (basketball)
Centers (basketball)
Texas Longhorns women's basketball players
Oregon Ducks women's basketball players